Malcolm "Molly" Duncan (24 August 1945 – 8 October 2019) was a Scottish tenor saxophonist, keyboardist, and founding member of Average White Band.

Career
Malcolm "Molly" Duncan recorded with Ray Charles, Tom Petty, Buddy Guy, Ben E. King, Dire Straits, Bryan Ferry and many others and played live with artists including Marvin Gaye, Chaka Khan and Eric Clapton. In the late 1990s and early 2000s he collaborated with many drum and bass artists, including Intense, of which his son Dan Duncan is a member. These recordings were mostly released on the Good Looking Records label.

He collaborated with other studio musicians to form Knee Deep, a funk and fusion group; and Cold Sweat and the Horny Horns.

In July 2015,  Malcolm "Molly" Duncan, along, with Steve Ferrone and Hamish Stuart reunited to form The 360 Band. This was in essence one half of the original Average White Band. They released an album titled Three Sixty in 2017 and performed live together along with supporting musicians.

Death
Duncan died at his home in Bocholt, Germany on 7 October 2019, at age 74, shortly after it had been announced that he had been diagnosed with terminal cancer.

References

1945 births
2019 deaths
21st-century saxophonists
Alumni of the University of Dundee
Average White Band members
Scottish saxophonists
People from Montrose, Angus
The Bunch members
20th-century saxophonists